"Resonance" is the debut single from British dance group LuvBug featuring vocals from British singer Talay Riley  produced by Pantha. It was released as a digital download on 5 October 2014 in the United Kingdom. The song has peaked to number 13 on the UK Singles Chart.

Track listing

Charts

Release history

References

2014 singles
2014 songs
Polydor Records singles
Talay Riley songs